Hubert Newman Wigmore Church (13 June 1857 – 8 April 1932) was an Australian poet.

Church was born in Hobart, Tasmania, the son of Hubert Day Church and his wife Mary Ann. His father, a barrister, came from Somerset and was a descendant of the family of John Hampden. Hubert Church was taken to England when eight years old, and was educated at Guildford and Felstead. Around 16 years of age Church  went to New Zealand and later joined the treasury department at Wellington, New Zealand.

In 1902 Church's first volume of verse, The West Wind, was published at Sydney, this was followed by Poems (1904), published at Wellington, New Zealand, and Egmont, at Melbourne in 1908. In 1911 he retired from the New Zealand public service, and in 1912 went to Melbourne. There he collected the best of his poems from his earlier volumes and published them with 10 additional pieces under the title of Poems. In 1913 he went to England and during the war was engaged in voluntary war-work. In 1916 he published a novel, Tonks, a New Zealand Yarn, and in 1919 returned to New Zealand. He went to Melbourne in October 1923, where he became well known in literary circles, and was much liked and admired.

When he was 12 years old he was struck on the head by a cricket ball and he became completely deaf. Relying on his own resources, he read widely.

He died at East Malvern (a suburb of Melbourne) on 8 April 1932. In December 1900 he married Catherine Livingstone McGregor, who survived him; there were no children.

References
 Dictionary of Australian Biography Ca-Ch] at gutenberg.net.au
Biography at PoemHunter.com

External links
 Herbert Newman Wigmore Church (1857-1932) Gravesite at Brighton General Cemetery (Vic)
Poems of Hubert Church

1857 births
1932 deaths
Australian poets
People from Hobart